Hugo Rosák (1926–1982) was an international speedway rider from Czechoslovakia.

Speedway career 
Rosák was champion of Czechoslovakia on four occasions after winning the Czechoslovakian Championship in 1949, 1954, 1955 and 1956.

References 

1926 births
1982 deaths
Czech speedway riders
People from Kolín District
Sportspeople from the Central Bohemian Region